Jung San (born ), more commonly known by his stage name San E, is a South Korean rapper. He debuted in 2010 under JYP Entertainment, where he was the label's first solo rapper. He left the company in 2013 to sign with hip hop label Brand New Music. He left the company in 2018 and established hip hop label FameUs Entertainment in 2019.

San E has released one full-length album: The Boy Who Cried Wolf (2015), and three extended plays: Everybody Ready? (2010), 'Not' Based on the True Story (2013), and Season of Suffering (2017). San E has received several major awards, including Best Hip Hop Song at the 2010 Korean Music Awards, Best Rap Performance at the 2015 Mnet Asian Music Awards, and the Hip Hop Award at the 2016 Golden Disc Awards and at the 2016 Seoul Music Awards.

Early life
San E was born on January 23, 1985, in South Korea. He moved with his family to Atlanta, Georgia, US, when he was a middle school student because his parents had been struggling financially as a result of the 1997 Asian financial crisis. He attended the University of Georgia, where he majored in graphic design.

Career

2008–2009: Mixtapes and underground fame 
San E released his first mixtapes Ready To Be Signed and Ready To Be Famous in 2008 and 2009, respectively. As a way to draw attention to his self-released music, San E jokingly dissed established underground rapper Verbal Jint in one of his songs. The diss brought him attention from the Korean hip hop community and from Verbal Jint himself, who invited San E to join his hip hop crew, Overclass.

2010–2012: JYP Entertainment and Everybody Ready?
Still unsigned, San E won Best Hip Hop Song at the 2010 Korean Music Awards for the track "Rap Genius." Soon after, he became the first solo rapper to sign with JYP Entertainment, one of the "big three" records labels in the k-pop industry. That September, he released his first mini-album, Everybody Ready?, which featured fellow JYP Entertainment artists Min (of Miss A), and Joo and Yeeun (of Wonder Girls). He debuted several days later on the television music show, M Countdown, with his single "Tasty San," featuring Min. In November, San E started another round of promotions for the single, "LoveSick," the music video for which starred label mate Sohee of Wonder Girls.

In 2011, San E released several singles, including “Please Don't Go," a collaboration with rapper Outsider and singer Lee Changmin (of 2AM). The song reached #14 on the Gaon Digital Chart, making it his highest charted song while contracted under JYP Entertainment. He also collaborated that year with Verbal Jint, Beenzino, Swings, and other artists on the single "Stand Up, Japan!" which benefited Japan's relief efforts after the Tohoku tsunami.

2013–2018: Brand New Music and top ten success

In April 2013, San E ended his contract with JYP Entertainment, saying that he was leaving on good terms. That June, he joined hip hop label, Brand New Music, home to his Overclass crew mate, Verbal Jint. San E achieved his first #1 hit on the Gaon Digital Chart with the song, "Story of Someone I Know," from the album 'Not' Based on the True Story. His next three singles, "Where Did You Sleep?" (feat. Verbal Jint and Swings), "Break-Up Dinner" (feat. Sanchez of Phantom), and "What's Wrong With Me" (feat. Kang Min Hee), all reached the top ten of the Gaon Digital Chart. San E's success continued with the single "A Midsummer Night's Sweetness," a collaboration with Raina (of After School). The song was an instant hit and achieved #1 on ten music charts shortly after its debut. The song went on to win awards that year at the Gaon Chart K-Pop Awards, the MelOn Music Awards, and the Seoul Music Awards. His next single, "Body Language" (featuring Bumkey), was also a #1 hit, topping both the Gaon Digital Chart and seven Korean real-time music charts shortly after its release, despite its 19+ rating. In June 2017, San E was featured in Hyoyeon's single "Wannabe". San E was also the rap mentor for KBS2's survival show, The Unit.

In late 2018, Brand New Music terminated San E's contract after the rapper made a series of controversial remarks about feminism.

2019–present: CEO of FameUs Entertainment 
In 2019, San E established hip hop label FameUs Entertainment and recruited rappers Errday, Malkey, and Be'O. They released their first compilation album God FameUs on April 9, 2020.

Personal life

Relationship and marriage 
On August 23, 2022, San E's agency announced that he is getting married to his non-celebrity girlfriend on September 24. They married in a private ceremony on September 24, 2022, in Cheongdam-dong, Gangnam-gu, Seoul.

Discography

Studio albums

Extended plays

Charted songs

Filmography

Television variety programs

Awards and nominations

Gaon Chart K-Pop Awards 

|-
| 2013
|"Story of Someone I Know"
|Song/Artist of the Year (August)
| 
|-
| 2014
| "A Midsummer Night's Sweetness" (with Raina)
| Song/Artist of the Year (July)
|

Golden Disk Awards 

|-
| 2015
|"A Midsummer Night's Sweetness" (with Raina)
|Digital Bonsang
| 
|-
| 2016
| The Boy Who Cried Wolf
| Best Rap/Hip Hop Award
|

Korean Music Awards 

|-
|2010
|"Rap Genius"
|Best Hip Hop Song
|

MelOn Music Awards 

|-
| rowspan="4"| 2014
| rowspan="3"|"A Midsummer Night's Sweetness" (with Raina)
| Best Song
| 
|-
| Hot Trend
| 
|-
| Rap/Hip Hop
| 
|-
| "What's Wrong With Me?"
| OST
|

Mnet Asian Music Awards 

|-
| rowspan="4"| 2014 
| "A Midsummer Night's Sweetness" (with Raina)
| rowspan="2"|Song of the Year
| 
|-
| rowspan="2"| "Body Language"
|
|-
|Best Rap Performance
| 
|- 
|"A Midsummer Night's Sweetness" (with Raina)
| Best Collaboration
| 
|-
| rowspan="2"| 2015
| rowspan="2"| "Me You"
| Song of the Year
| 
|-
| Best Rap Performance
|

Seoul Music Awards 

|-
| 2014
| San E & Raina
| Hip Hop/Rap Award
| 
|-
| 2015
| San E
| Hip Hop/Rap Award
|

References

External links

 

1985 births
Living people
Brand New Music artists
JYP Entertainment artists
Korean Music Award winners
Melon Music Award winners
MAMA Award winners
Musicians from Incheon
South Korean male rappers
South Korean hip hop record producers
South Korean television personalities
University of Georgia alumni